Fonthill Grottoes is a 0.69 hectare biological Site of Special Scientific Interest, in woodland adjacent to Fonthill Lake in Wiltshire, notified in 1994. Its SSSI designation is due to its roosting bats: the site is the sixth largest hibernaculum in Britain.

The three follies are named "The Dark Walks", "The Hermitage" and "The Quarry".

Biological interest

The site is used as a hibernation roost site by up to 207 bats of up to nine species. Greater and Lesser Horseshoe Bats are among seven species which roost here on a regular basis, and Bechstein's Bat and Barbastelle, two species rare in Britain, have each been recorded on several occasions.

Sources
 Natural England citation sheet for the site (accessed 31 March 2022)

External links
 Natural England website (SSSI information)

Grottoes
Sites of Special Scientific Interest in Wiltshire
Sites of Special Scientific Interest notified in 1994